Okróshka is a cold soup of Russian origin and probably originated in the Volga region.

The classic soup is a mix of mostly raw vegetables (like cucumbers, radishes and spring onions), boiled potatoes, eggs, cooked meat such as beef, veal, sausages or ham and kvass, which is a low-alcoholic (1.5% or less) beverage made from fermented black or rye bread. Okroshka is usually garnished with sour cream (smetana). Later versions that first appeared in Soviet times use light or diluted kefir, whey, ayran, or mineral water instead of kvass.

The ingredients are diced and then mixed with kvass just before eating; the ratio of chopped food to kvass is similar to that of cereal to milk.  This allows the vegetables to retain their texture. For that same reason, even though the ingredients are similar to those in a Russian salad, the taste of okroshka is quite different from that of the salad.

Okroshka is mostly served in summer because the soup combines the refreshing taste of kvass and the lightness of a salad. Salt and sugar can be added according to taste. In the recipes with mineral water, there is one more addition to the ingredients of okroshka: freshly squeezed lemon juice; this is to replace the flavor in the absence of kvass.

Okroshka is always served cold. Sometimes ice cubes are added to served portions to keep the soup cold in hot weather.

Gallery

See also

 List of Russian dishes
 List of soups
 List of cold soups

References

Further reading
 Solley, P. (2004). An Exaltation of Soups: The Soul-Satisfying Story of Soup, as Told in More Than 100 Recipes. New York: Three Rivers Press. .
 Mobile Reference (ed.) (2007). Travel Saint Petersburg, Russia: City Guide, Phrasebook, and Maps. Boston: Sound Tells, LLC. .

External links
 A customizable Okroshka recipe: Cuceesprouts.com
 An easy soup for short Russian summers Irakli Iosebashvili, September 3, 2009, Russia Beyond the Headlines, article with recipe.
Okroshka – Cold Summer Soup

Cold soups
Russian inventions
Russian soups
Ukrainian soups